Serhiy Volodymyrovych Petrenko (born 8 December 1956) is a retired Ukrainian sprint canoeist. He competed in doubles at the 1976 and 1980 Olympics and won two gold medals in 1976. He also won seven medals at the ICF Canoe Sprint World Championships with three golds (C-1 500 m: 1974, 1975; C-2 10000 m: 1977), three silvers (C-1 500 m: 1978, 1979; C-2 500 m: 1982), and one bronze (C-2 10000 m: 1983).

References

External links

1956 births
Canoeists at the 1976 Summer Olympics
Canoeists at the 1980 Summer Olympics
Living people
Olympic canoeists of the Soviet Union
Olympic gold medalists for the Soviet Union
Soviet male canoeists
Ukrainian male canoeists
Olympic medalists in canoeing
ICF Canoe Sprint World Championships medalists in Canadian
Medalists at the 1976 Summer Olympics
K. D. Ushinsky South Ukrainian National Pedagogical University alumni
Sportspeople from Khmelnytskyi, Ukraine